A hanger, or a post, in barbershop music is a long note, held by one of the voices in the quartet, while the other voices are free to change notes, and even breathe. Hangers usually occur in the  tag of a Barbershop song, although they may occur anywhere. The held note is typically the tonic note of the song (e.g. if the song is in G Major, the hanger is usually a G). Any one of the four voices can have the hanger, although the hanger is typically a high note, therefore it is usually assigned to either the Lead or Tenor.

Some Barbershop arrangements have elaborate tags featuring a long hanger, and the hanger is usually sung at a high volume (fortissimo in musical terminology). The best singers in Barbershop quartets at the highest level of competition can sing hangers that can be upward of 20 seconds long. The combination of the one note, held long and loud, and the other three voices singing various creative harmonies around that one note, is one of the most thrilling aspects of Barbershop music.

Singing a hanger is also referred to as posting a note.

Barbershop music